Fulano may refer to:
 Fulano, a placeholder name in Portuguese and Spanish
 Fulano (band), a Chilean progressive rock/fusion jazz band formed in 1984
 Fulano de Tal, a Latin rock band, formed in 1995 in Miami